Swaminarayan Gadi  may refer to:

Seats of the Swaminarayan Sampraday:
 Swaminarayan Gadi

 LaxmiNarayan Dev Gadi of the Swaminarayan Sampraday
 NarNarayan Dev Gadi of the Swaminarayan Sampraday

Om Shree Swaminarayan Bapa Swamibapa